Eisgarn is a town in the district of Gmünd in the Austrian state of Lower Austria.

Geography
Eisgarn lies in the northern Waldviertel in Lower Austria 6 km north of Heidenreichstein. About 42.73 percent of the municipality is forested.

References

External links
Municipal website

Cities and towns in Gmünd District